Sycamore Review is an American literary journal based at Purdue University in West Lafayette, Indiana. Each year, the journal awards the Wabash Prizes for Fiction and Poetry.

Henry Hughes is the launch editor-in-chief of Sycamore Review where he worked from 1988 to 1991.

See also
List of literary magazines

References

External links
Official website

1988 establishments in Indiana
Biannual magazines published in the United States
Literary magazines published in the United States
Magazines established in 1988
Magazines published in Indiana
Purdue University